KFLV may refer to:

 KFLV (FM), a radio station (89.9 FM) licensed to Wilber, Nebraska, United States
 the ICAO code for Sherman Army Airfield